

Mecca (Makkah al-Mukarramah) is a city in Saudi Arabia and the holiest site in Islam.

Mecca  or Makkah may also refer to:

Geography
Makkah Province, Saudi Arabia, the province surrounding the city
Mecca, California, a town in Riverside County, California, United States
Mecca, Indiana, a town in Parke County, Indiana, United States
Mecca, Missouri, an unincorporated community
Mecca, Ohio, an unincorporated community
Mecca Township, Trumbull County, Ohio, United States

Brands
Mecca-Cola, a cola-flavoured carbonated beverage
Mecca Ointment, a first aid ointment, available in drug stores across Canada
Mecca Leisure Group, a UK entertainment business
Mecca Bingo, a UK-based social and bingo club leisure company formerly part of Mecca Leisure, now owned by Rank Group
Mecca Dance Hall Tottenham, a former entertainment venue in Tottenham, London
Milwaukee Exposition Convention Center and Arena, since renamed UW–Milwaukee Panther Arena

Entertainment 
Mecca (musician), St. Lucian hip hop, pop, and EDM artist
Mecca (Power character)
"Mecca" (song), a 1963 hit single by Gene Pitney
Mecca, a 1996 album by the Memphis Pilgrims, a rock group led by Michael Falzarano
Mecca, a 2009 album by Persia White

Other
Black mecca, a term in the United States for a city to which black people are attracted

See also
Macca (disambiguation)
Meca (disambiguation)
Mecha, piloted or remote-controlled vehicles in certain subgenres of science fiction
MEChA, an organisation of Chicano students in the United States
Meccano, a metal construction kit toy
Mekka, one of the earlier aliases of DJ Jake Williams